Grant Alden Wistrom (born July 3, 1976) is a former American college and professional football player who was a defensive end in the National Football League (NFL) for nine seasons.  Wistrom played college football for the University of Nebraska and was a two-time All-American.  He was drafted in the first round of the 1998 NFL Draft, and played professionally for the St. Louis Rams and Seattle Seahawks of the NFL.

Early years
Wistrom was born in Joplin, Missouri to Ron and Kathy Wistrom. For a short period of time, he went to Forest City Elementary School and Teague Middle School in Altamonte Springs, Florida. He began his football career in Webb City, Missouri, where he played for the Webb City High School football team, the Cardinals, as a defensive end and tight end.  As a defensive end, he compiled 122 tackles, eight sacks, six fumble recoveries, nine forced fumbles and a blocked punt; as a tight end, he caught 30 passes for 527 yards and five touchdowns and rushed 11 times for 115 yards and three touchdowns.  Wistrom led his team to two Class 4A state championships.  He was chosen as a first-team high school All-America selection by Super Prep, Blue Chip and USA Today, and earned Top 100 Honors from Scholastic Coach magazine.  Wistrom also played basketball and competed in track and field.

College career
Wistrom attended the University of Nebraska-Lincoln, where he helped anchor the defensive line for the Nebraska Cornhuskers football team from 1994 to 1997.  During his four-year college career, the Huskers compiled a 49-2 record, winning three national championships in that span (1994, 1995, and 1997). A two-time consensus first-team All-American, Wistrom became Nebraska's fourth Lombardi Award winner as the nation's top lineman following the 1997 season.

As a senior captain, the 6-5, 255-pound Wistrom finished with 51 tackles, including 8.5 sacks and 17 tackles for loss, leading the Blackshirts in both categories on his way to earning Big 12 Defensive Player-of-the-Year honors.  A finalist for the Bronko Nagurski Defensive Player-of-the-Year award, Wistrom helped the Huskers rank fifth nationally in total defense and second nationally against the run. He led Nebraska to a perfect 13-0 season record. He was also a consensus All-American.

In 1996, Wistrom was named the Big 12 Defensive Player of the Year, helping NU to top-10 rankings in all four major defensive categories. A first-team All-American and finalist for the Nagurski Award. Wistrom finished third on the team in tackles with 75. while leading the Huskers in both sacks (9.5-48 yards lost) and tackles for loss (20-74).

A third-team All-American as a sophomore. Wistrom recorded 44 stops, including a team-leading 15 tackles for loss, as Nebraska went 12-0 and repeated as national champions. He also had four sacks, earning first-team All-Big Eight honors as NU ranked second nationally against the rush, fourth in points allowed and 13th in total defense. During his freshman campaign, Wistrom made his presence known, earning Big Eight Newcomer-of-the-Year honors in helping the Huskers to their first national title since 1971. He played in all 13 games, recording 36 stops and 4.5 sacks, as one of only two true Husker freshmen to see playing time.

Wistrom holds the school record for tackles for loss with 58.5 for 260 yards and ranks second with 26.5 sacks, had his No. 98 jersey retired during the 1998 season. His career totals include 206 total tackles, 26.5 sacks for 178 yards, one interception, four forced fumbles and one fumble recovery.

Wistrom was a two-time first-team CoSIDA Academic All-American and became the 13th Husker to win the NCAA's highest honor, the NCAA Top Eight Award, in 1997. He also earned the National Football Foundation and College Football Hall of Fame Postgraduate Scholarship following his senior campaign and was the Big 12 Male Athlete of the Year for the 1997-98 season. He graduated with a 3.43 GPA.
Honors include:
College Football Hall of Fame member (2009)
Voted as DE on the All-Time Cornhusker team
Recipient of the Lombardi Award, given to nation's top collegiate lineman (1997)
Recipient of the Bill Willis Trophy, given to nations top defensive lineman (1996)
Consensus All-America 1996, 1997
All-Big 12 Conference First-team  (1996, 1997)
Big 12 Defensive Player of the Year (1996, 1997)
Consensus Academic All-America (1996, 1997)
Academic All-Big 12 honors (1996, 1997)
Earned third-team All-America honors by Associated Press and first-team All-Big Eight Conference honors sophomore season (1995)
Selected as Newcomer of the Year by Big Eight conference freshman season (1994)

Collegiate statistics

Notes - Statistics include bowl game performances.

Professional career

Pre-draft

Wistrom was considered a "high energy player who (was) both durable and versatile and good against the run and pass",  Even after adding 15 pounds to his frame, Wistrom ran a personal best 4.61 40-yard dash at the University of Nebraska NFL pro day. Wistrom measured 6'4⅞ and 273 pounds at his pro day workout.

St. Louis Rams
Wistrom was  selected by the St. Louis Rams as the sixth overall pick in the 1998 NFL Draft. On July 25, 1998, Wistrom signed a six-year, $12.765 million contract that included a $6 million signing bonus.

1998: Played in 13 games on defense and special teams and finished season with 30 tackles, three sacks, one fumble recovery and five special teams tackles and was named Rams Defensive Rookie of the Year by coaches.

1999: Started all 16 regular season and three playoff games at right defensive end and was selected to the 1999 All-Madden team by Fox Sports announcer John Madden while setting career highs in tackles (60), sacks (6.5), interceptions (two), interception returns for touchdown (two), passes defensed (seven), and one fumble recovery. Grant tied for team lead with two interceptions returned for touchdown. Won Super Bowl XXXIV.

2000: Started 16 games at right defensive end and had a career year, registering career-bests in tackles (71), sacks (11), and had 29 quarterback pressures, four passes defensed and one forced fumble, tying for seventh in NFC in sacks.

2001: Had best season of career with recording a new career-highs with 96 tackles (47 solo) and two forced fumbles, and tied career bests with two interceptions and one fumble recovery. He finished second on the team with 9 sacks and had three passes defensed and 19 quarterback pressures and was 10th in NFC in sacks. In post-season action, he finished fifth on team with career-high 19 postseason tackles (11 solo) and second on club with two sacks.

2002: Played in 15 games with 14 starts. Finished season with another career-high 97 tackles (43 solo), including four for loss and also tallied 4.5 sacks, one interception, three passes defensed, one forced fumble, and career-high two fumble recoveries.

2003: Started all 16 regular season games and one postseason game for the Rams. Recorded career-high 108 tackles (57 solo) with 7.5 sacks, a forced fumble and a fumble recovery and four passes defensed.

Seattle Seahawks
After six seasons, including two Super Bowl appearances and one Super Bowl win, with the St. Louis Rams, Wistrom became a free agent. On March 4, 2004, he signed a six-year, $33 million contract that included a $14 million signing bonus with the Seattle Seahawks.

2004: Started all nine games he played. Suffered knee injury at New England (October 17, 2004) and was forced to miss weeks 7-10. Returned to play four games before reinjuring knee and missed the final three games and Wild Card Playoff Game. Finished the season with 38 total tackles (27 solo), 3.5 sacks, four passes defensed, a forced fumble, and a fumble recovery.

2005: Started all 16 regular season games. Finished the season with 52 tackles (41 solo), 4.0 sacks and six passes defensed, the second most he had ever recorded.

2006: Started all 16 regular season games (the fifth time in his nine-year professional career). Finished the season with 37 tackles (30 solo), 4.0 sacks, one forced fumble, one fumble recovery and one pass defensed. However, he played only 56 percent of the downs because of injuries and the arrival of pass-rushing linebacker Julian Peterson in free agency. Peterson replaced Wistrom as the right end in passing situations. As a result, Wistrom had his fewest tackles since his rookie season with the Rams.

Wistrom was released after the 2006 season after the Seahawks asked Wistrom to restructure his contract to reduce the $3.5 million salary he was due in 2007. The other option was being released, and Wistrom decided to go that route and later retired. Wistrom had collected $21 million of his free agent contract in those three seasons.

NFL statistics

Charity work

The Grant Wistrom Foundation, created in July 2002, strives to allow pediatric cancer patients opportunities to just be children. At a Foundation event they are able to connect with other children who understand their world as both a child and a patient, fostering friendships built on these common bonds.
The plight of young oncology patients was brought to Grant's attention during his senior year at the University of Nebraska-Lincoln, when he befriended a young Husker fan with leukemia from his home state of Missouri. To help prepare the child for the loss of his hair during treatment, Grant, and Nebraska teammates Jason Peter and Jared Tomich, included Kendall in their pre-game ritual of shaving their heads and presented him with an honorary blackshirt jersey.

The Grant Wistrom Foundation consists of four programs:

Circle of Friends: The Circle of Friends experience begins with a four-day Wisconsin winter trip that brings together 40 pediatric oncology patients from 9 U.S. Cities. They enjoy skiing, tubing, disco bowling and snowmobiling, along with discussing the latest fashion trends and the newest music to hit the charts. For many of the participants these new friendships offer encouragement and support as they navigate through their course of recovery. Every two years the group is reunited on a summer trip where new adventures await them. Fellow Seattle Seahawk Jerry Wunsch, Brian Young of the New Orleans Saints, Rich Coady of the Dallas Cowboys, Jared Tomich of the Kansas City Chiefs and Chris Kelsay of the Buffalo Bills join Grant in hosting these events.

Local Outreach: The Foundation supports a number of events that have included, Kids Only Day at a Family Fun Center, a VIP Game Day party, Mom's Spa Day and a Dad's Mariners game outing.

Section 98: The Foundation donates ten tickets for each home Seahawks game to pediatric oncology patients and their families so that they may enjoy the Seahawks experience. Each guest receives a T-shirt and a pre game meal.

Charities for Children: The Foundation actively supports various children's organizations through financial and/or merchandise donations in Washington, Missouri, Nebraska and Illinois.

In addition to the work of his own Foundation, Grant continues to support the work of the Seattle Seahawks Community Outreach program

Notes

Grant logged his first sack in the NFL by forcing San Francisco 49ers quarterback Steve Young out of bounds in the first quarter on October 25, 1998.
Grant made his first interception in the NFL and returned it 91 yards for a touchdown against the Atlanta Falcons on October 17, 1999. The interception return was sixth longest in St Louis Rams franchise history and longest ever by Rams' defensive lineman.
Grant registered his career-high 17 tackles, including a career-high 10 solo, against the Baltimore Ravens on November 9, 2003.
Grant is the middle child of three boys. Grant's older brother, Chance, is a Superintendent and his younger brother, Tracey, is employed as a drug representative. Chance played college football at the University of Central Missouri, Tracey joined Grant at The University of Nebraska-Lincoln. Tracey was also drafted into the NFL, one of the last picks of the 2002 NFL Draft, but never played beyond the preseason.
Grant's father, Ron is the property manager for WIP Properties, and his mother, Kathy is co-owner of The Wax Bucket, a combination gift shop and candle manufacture which is located in Grove, Oklahoma.  Additionally, Kathy has authored the book Mrs Wistrom's ABCs: What I Learned Raising Three All-Americans, described as a practical, down-to-earth look at parenting.

References

External links
 

1976 births
Living people
American football defensive ends
Nebraska Cornhuskers football players
Seattle Seahawks players
St. Louis Rams players
All-American college football players
College Football Hall of Fame inductees
People from Grove, Oklahoma
Sportspeople from Joplin, Missouri
People from Webb City, Missouri
Players of American football from Missouri